The Australia cricket team toured the West Indies in June and July 2021 to play three One Day International (ODI) and five Twenty20 International (T20I) matches. The ODI matches formed part of the inaugural 2020–2023 ICC Cricket World Cup Super League. The fixtures for the tour were confirmed by Cricket West Indies (CWI) in May 2021. The Australian cricket team arrived in the West Indies on 28 May 2021, after the majority players had been vaccinated for COVID-19.

The West Indies won the first three T20I matches to win the series. Australia won the fourth T20I by four runs, and the West Indies won the fifth T20I by 16 runs, to win the series 4–1. In the third T20I, Chris Gayle became the first batsman to score 14,000 runs in Twenty20 cricket.

Australia won the first ODI by 133 runs to take a 1–0 lead in the series. The second ODI was suspended after the toss took place, following a positive test for COVID-19. CWI later confirmed that the match had been suspended after a non-playing member of their staff had provided the positive test. On 23 July 2021, CWI announced the rescheduled fixtures for the second and third ODIs. The second ODI match eventually took place on 24 July 2021, with the West Indies winning by four wickets to level the series. Australia won the third ODI by six wickets to win the series 2–1.

Squads

On 17 May 2021, Australia named a 23-man preliminary squad for the tour with Aaron Finch being named as their captain.  On 8 June 2021, six more players were added to Australia's preliminary squad. Australia did not name individual squads for the ODI and T20I matches, opting instead to name a combined squad of 18 players for the tour. Tanveer Sangha and Nathan Ellis were named as reserve players. Ahead of the first ODI, Alex Carey was named captain of Australia. On 25 July 2021, Australia's captain Aaron Finch was ruled out of the ODI series due to an injury.

On 18 May 2021, Cricket West Indies (CWI) named a 18-man provisional squad for the T20I matches, with Kieron Pollard captaining the team. On 7 July 2021, CWI named a 15-member squad for the ODI matches. Ahead of the third T20I, Oshane Thomas was added to the West Indies' squad. For the fourth and fifth T20Is, CWI added Akeal Hosein and Kevin Sinclair to their squad. They replaced Shimron Hetmyer and Obed McCoy who both had minor injuries. For the last T20I, CWI added Darren Bravo to their squad. Roston Chase was ruled out of the ODI series, with Hayden Walsh Jr. replacing him in the West Indies' ODI squad.

Practice matches
Ahead of the T20I matches, the Australian team played two intra-squad games at the Daren Sammy Cricket Ground in Saint Lucia.

T20I series

1st T20I

2nd T20I

3rd T20I

4th T20I

5th T20I

ODI series

1st ODI

2nd ODI

3rd ODI

Notes

References

External links
 Series home at ESPN Cricinfo

2021 in Australian cricket
2021 in West Indian cricket
International cricket competitions in 2021
Australian cricket tours of the West Indies